Racing Club du Pays de Fontainebleau is a football club located in Fontainebleau, France. The club competes in the Départemental 1, the ninth tier of French football.

Notable players 

  Tanguy Nianzou
  Christopher Nkunku
  Lilian Thuram

Notable managers 

  Alfred Aston
  Eddie Hudanski
  Francisco Rubio

Name changes 

 1912–1966: Club Sportif de Fontainebleau
 1966–1978: Entente Bagneaux-Fontainebleau-Nemours (merged with AS Bagneaux-Nemours)
 1978–1987: Club Sportif de Fontainebleau
 1987–1988: Entente Melun-Fontainebleau 77 (merged with US Melun for one season)
 1988–1999: Club Sportif de Fontainebleau
 1999–present: Racing Club du Pays de Fontainebleau

Honours

Notes

References

External links 
 Club website
 Club website on Footeo
 Profile on WorldFootball.net

Football clubs in France
Association football clubs established in 1912
1912 establishments in France

Sport in Seine-et-Marne
Football clubs in Île-de-France